Broadbeach Waters is a suburb in the City of Gold Coast, Queensland, Australia.

Geography 

The northern boundary of Broadbeach Waters follows the Nerang River.  The suburb is almost completed residential with most properties adjacent to or very close to man-made canals. Pacific Fair Shopping Centre is located in the south east corner of the suburb.

There are a number of neighborhoods in the suburb:

 Cypress Gardens 
 Florida Gardens
 Miami Keys
 Moana
 Rialto
 Rio Vista

History

The median age of the Broadbeach Waters population was 43 years, 5 years above the national median of 38. 65.2% of people were born in Australia. The most common countries of birth were New Zealand 7.3% and England 5.0%. 81.5% of people spoke only English at home. Other languages spoken at home included Mandarin at 1.7%. The most common responses for religion were No Religion 29.9%, Catholic 26.3% and Anglican 17.8%.

Education 
There are no schools in Broadbeach Waters. The nearest government primary schools are Broadbeach State School in neighboring Broadbeach to the south-east and Surfers Paradise State School in neighbouring Surfers Paradise to the north-east. The nearest government secondary school is Merrimac State High School in neighboring Mermaid Waters to the south.

Amenities 
There are a number of parks in the suburb, including:

 Albert Recreational Park
 Bauhinia Park

 Bermuda Reserve

 Bill Crompton Park

 Boronia Park

 Conifer Cresent Park

 Cypress Drive Park

 Darnay Road Reserves

 Dick Hamilton Park

 Doonbur North Reserve

 Doonbur South Reserve

 Fremar Street Drainage Reserve

 Goolagong Park

 Hart Park

 Hibiscus Park

 Ipsley Park

 Jack Gaven Park

 Jeff Munroe Park

 John Davidson Park

 Kalimna Drive Reserve

 Kalimna Narrow Parkland

 Lamb Street Reserve

 Lorraine Yelland Park

 Moana Park

 Monaco Street Reserve

 Passive Park

 Pat Gilbert Park

 Platell Park

 Sons And Daughters Park

 T E Peters Parklands

 Tanhah Ct Reserve

 Tui Johnson Park

 Villa Court Lake

Attractions 
Pacific Fair, the largest shopping centre on the Gold Coast is located on Hooker Boulevard in Broadbeach Waters, not far from the intersection on the Gold Coast Highway. As a result of several redevelopments over the years Pacific Fair boasts over 400 specialty stores, five anchor department stores, two supermarkets, two food courts and a multi cinema complex.
In January 2014 work began on re-developing and re-branding the shopping centre. $670 million is being spent on expanding the centre to cater for a 120 new specialty stores, making the centre the fourth largest in the nation and second in Queensland, only Westfield Chermside in Brisbane is larger.

See also 
 Suburbs of the Gold Coast

References

External links

 

Suburbs of the Gold Coast, Queensland